Grin, grins, or GRIN may refer to:

 A facial expression, see smile
 Grin (Coroner album), 1993
 Grin (band), a band formed by Nils Lofgren
 Grin (Grin album), 1971
 "Grins" (song), a 2013 song by Charli XCX off the album True Romance (Charli XCX album)
Grin (surname)
Grins, Austria
 Germplasm Resources Information Network, a software project
 Grin (company), a defunct Swedish video game developer
 GRIN Campaign, an organisation which campaigns for equality in education
 GRIN, an acronym for gradient index; see Gradient-index optics

See also

 
 
 Grün, a German word and surname meaning green